The first season of The Voice Brasil premiered on Globo on Sunday, September 23, 2012 in the  (BRT / AMT) daytime slot.

On December 16, 2012, Ellen Oléria from Team Brown won the competition with 39% of the final vote over Ju Moraes (Team Claudia), Liah Soares (Team Daniel) and Maria Christina (Team Lulu).

Selection process
Auditions

Online applications for The Voice Brasil were open from May 13 to July 23, 2012. Selected applications were then called to regional auditions held in eight capital cities across Brazil:

Over 20.000 singers sent online applications, but only 105 of them were selected to perform on the blind audition phase.

Teams
 Key

Blind auditions
Key
{| class="toccolours" style="font-size: 100%; white-space: nowrap;"
|-
| style="background:#ffffff; border:1px solid black;"|   ✔'  
| Coach pressed "I WANT YOU" button
|-
| style="background:#ffc40c; border:1px solid black;"|       
| Artist defaulted to a coach's team
|-
| style="background:#fdfc8f; border:1px solid black;"|       
| style="padding-right: 8px" | Artist picked a coach's team
|-
| style="background:#dcdcdc; border:1px solid black;"|       
| Artist eliminated with no coach pressing their "I WANT YOU" button
|-
|}

Battles

Key

Live shows
Key

Week 1: Playoffs

Week 2: Playoffs

Week 3: Playoffs & Quarterfinals

Week 4: Quarterfinals

Week 5: Semifinals

Week 6: Finals

Elimination chart
Key

Results

Contestant appearances on other earlier shows
 Karol Cândido was a finalist on High School Musical: A Seleção.
 Thaís Moreira was a finalist on the first season of Ídolos (9th place).
 Dani Moraes was a finalist on the fourth season of Ídolos (5th place).
 Maria Christina was a finalist on the third season of Ídolos (3rd place).
 Ludmillah Anjos was a semi-finalist on the first season of Ídolos'' (Top 30).

Ratings and reception

Brazilian ratings
All numbers are in points and provided by Kantar Ibope Media.

References

External links
 The Voice Brasil (2012) on MemóriaGlobo.com

1
2012 Brazilian television seasons